The Cycling Federation of the Islamic Republic of Iran is the national governing body of cycle racing in Iran. It is a member of the UCI and the Asian Cycling Confederation.

The CFI promotes and organizes races in Iran and is responsible for sending teams to major international events in other countries.

See also
Sport in Iran

External links
 Official website

Iran
Iran
Cycling
Cycle racing in Iran
Sports organizations established in 1947
1947 establishments in Iran